Helsloot is a Dutch surname. Notable people with the surname include:

Dries Helsloot (born 1937), Dutch cyclist
Misja Helsloot (born 1973), Dutch DJ

Dutch-language surnames